The 2012 season for  began in January with the Tour Down Under. As a UCI ProTeam, they were automatically invited and obligated to send a squad to every event in the UCI World Tour.

In February 2012, Alberto Contador was given a backdated two-year ban in relation to his doping case stemming from the 2010 Tour de France. As well as his results from that race, all of his results from 2011 and 2012 were disqualified, including his victory in the 2011 Giro d'Italia.

2012 roster
Ages as of 1 January 2012.

Riders who joined the team for the 2012 season

Riders who left the team during or after the 2011 season

Season victories

Victories originally obtained by Contador but vacated

Footnotes

References

2012 road cycling season by team
Tinkoff (cycling team)
2012 in Danish sport